The Temple of Juno Lacinia (or Hera Lacinia) is a ruined ancient Greek temple dedicated to Hera (Juno) located on Capo Colonna in Calabria, Italy, near Crotone (ancient Kroton). Remains of marble roof-tiles have been seen on the spot (Livy xlii.3) and architectural fragments were excavated in 1886–1887 by the Archaeological Institute of America. The sculptures found were mostly buried again, but a few fragments, some decorative terracottas and a dedicatory inscription to Hera of the 6th century BC, in private possession at Crotone, are described by F. von Duhn in Notizie degli scavi.

The date of the erection of the temple is postulated as 480–440 BC; it is not recorded by any ancient writer. It was reputed to have been founded by Hercules (Herakles) after he killed the bandit Lacinius, who attempted to steal some of the cattle of Geryon.

The temple has been described a "perhaps the most splendid [structure] in southern Italy." The federal treasury of the Italiote League was moved there in the 5th century BC, and remained there until relocated to Herakleia near Tarentum.

Before evacuating Italy in 206 BC, toward the close of the Second Punic War, Hannibal dedicated bronze plaque inscribed in Punic and Greek there detailing his accomplishments. 
In 173 BC, the Censor Quintus Fulvius Flaccus dedicated the Temple of Fortuna Equestris in Rome, for which he had stripped the marble tiles from the roof of the Temple of Juno. In 172, out of grief over tragic news about his sons, Flaccus hanged himself. "[T]here was a general belief that he had been driven mad by Juno Lacinia, in her anger at his spoliation of her temple." The Senate ordered the tiles returned, but, "as there was no one who understood how to replace the tiles they had been left in the precinct of the temple."

Cicero cites Coelius Antipater saying that the temple featured a golden column. Hannibal wanted to know whether or not it was solid gold, and drilled a hole and, determining that it was solid, decided to take it back to Carthage. The next night Juno appeared to him in a dream and threatened him with the loss of his remaining good eye if he took it. Hannibal obeyed the warning; he had a small statue of a heifer—sacred to Juno—cast from the drill shavings and mounted it on top of the column.

The temple was said to have still been fairly complete in the 16th century, but was destroyed to build the episcopal palace at Crotone.

See also
 List of Ancient Greek temples

References

 See R. Koldewey and O. Puchstein, Die griechischen Tempel in Unteritalien und Sicilien (Berlin 1899, 41).

Crotone
Hera
Buildings and structures in the Province of Crotone
5th-century BC establishments in Italy
Temples of Hera
5th-century BC religious buildings and structures
Destroyed temples